Schrödinger's cat is a thought experiment, usually described as a paradox, devised by Austrian physicist Erwin Schrödinger in 1935. It illustrates what he saw as absurdities in the views that other physicists had about quantum mechanics (ideas later labeled the Copenhagen interpretation), by applying them not to microscopic objects but to everyday ones. The thought experiment presents a cat that might be alive or dead, depending on an earlier random event. In the course of developing this experiment, he coined the term Verschränkung (entanglement). It was not long before science-fiction writers picked up this evocative concept, often using it in a humorous vein. Works of fiction have employed Schrödinger's thought experiment as plot device and as metaphor, in genres from apocalyptic science fiction to young-adult drama, making the cat more prominent in popular culture than in physics itself.

Schrödinger's cat has been a motive in many science fiction works, and used as a title of a number of them, including Greg Bear's "Schrödinger's Plague" (Analog, 29 March 1982), George Alec Effinger's "Schrödinger's Kitten" (Omni, September 1988), Ursula Le Guin's "Schrödinger's Cat" (in the 1974 anthology Universe 5), F. Gwynplaine MacIntyre's "Schrödinger's Cat-Sitter" (Analog, July/August 2001), Rudy Rucker's "Schrödinger's Cat" (Analog, 30 March 1981), and Robert Anton Wilson's Schrödinger's Cat Trilogy (1988), illustrating various interpretations of quantum physics. In addition to novels and short stories, Schrödinger's cat has appeared in film, poetry theatre, live-action television, cartoons, and webcomics.

References

Popular culture
Physics in fiction
Science fiction themes
Science in popular culture